Ralina Doshkova (born ) is a Bulgarian female volleyball player. She is part of the Bulgaria women's national volleyball team.

She participated in the 2015 FIVB Volleyball World Grand Prix.
On club level she played for VC CSKA Sofia in 2015.

References

1995 births
Living people
Bulgarian women's volleyball players
Place of birth missing (living people)